Khazar-e Seh (also Romanized as Khaẕar-e Seh and Kheẕer-e Seh) is a village in Shoaybiyeh-ye Gharbi Rural District, Shadravan District, Shushtar County, Khuzestan Province, Iran. At the 2006 census, its population was 34, in 8 families.

References 

Populated places in Shushtar County